Acrocercops telestis is a moth of the family Gracillariidae. It is known from India (Bihar).

The larvae feed on Mallotus repandus, Trewia species (including Trewia nudiflora), Cinnamomum species, Eugenia cumini, Eugenia jambolana and Gmelina arborea. They probably mine the leaves of their host plant.

References

telestis
Moths described in 1911
Moths of Asia